Danilo Ezequiel Carando (born 5 August 1988) is an Argentine footballer‚ who plays as a forward for Cienciano del Cusco.

In January 2010 he was signed by Astra. In January 2017, Danilo Carando returned to Real Garcilaso.

References

Al Ahli reveal Carando ‚ qsl.com.qa, 14 January 2016

External links
 
 
 
 

1988 births
Living people
Argentine footballers
Talleres de Córdoba footballers
Ñublense footballers
FC Astra Giurgiu players
Oriente Petrolero players
Qatar SC players
Al Ahli SC (Doha) players
Tecos F.C. footballers
Fujairah FC players
Real Garcilaso footballers
Cusco FC footballers
Liga I players
Peruvian Primera División players
Qatar Stars League players
UAE First Division League players
Association football forwards
Argentine expatriate footballers
Expatriate footballers in Chile
Expatriate footballers in Ecuador
Expatriate footballers in Romania
Expatriate footballers in Mexico
Expatriate footballers in Peru
Expatriate footballers in Paraguay
Expatriate footballers in Bolivia
Expatriate footballers in Qatar
Argentine expatriate sportspeople in Chile
Argentine expatriate sportspeople in Romania
Expatriate footballers in the United Arab Emirates
Argentine expatriate sportspeople in Qatar
Argentine expatriate sportspeople in Paraguay
Argentine expatriate sportspeople in Peru
Argentine expatriate sportspeople in Ecuador
Argentine expatriate sportspeople in Mexico
Argentine expatriate sportspeople in Bolivia
Footballers from Córdoba, Argentina